Beirut Stars Sporting Club, formerly Bank of Beirut Sporting Club is a futsal club based in Beirut, Lebanon. Founded in 2020, it is the successor to the futsal club founded in 2013 as Bank of Beirut. The club has won five Lebanese Futsal League titles, four Lebanese Futsal Cups, and three Lebanese Futsal Super Cup, and have came in third place in the 2018 edition of the AFC Futsal Club Championship.

History 
Founded in 2013, Bank of Beirut SC was sponsored by Bank of Beirut and have won the Lebanese Futsal League five times. They became the first Lebanese futsal team to achieve a treble, winning the League, Cup, and super cup in the 2014–15 season. On 9 July 2020, due to the economic crisis in Lebanon, Bank of Beirut stopped their futsal activities.

On 8 October 2020, Beirut Stars SC bought the license of the dissolved club. Beirut Stars' president, Jad Deaibes, was the General Secretary of Bank of Beirut, and Hassan Hammoud, the club's coach, was the coach of Bank of Beirut.

Chronicle

Honours
Lebanese Futsal League
Winners (5): 2013–14, 2014–15, 2016–17, 2017–18, 2018–19

Lebanese Futsal Cup
Winners (4): 2014–15, 2015–16, 2017–18, 2018–19

Lebanese Futsal Super Cup
Winners (3): 2014, 2017, 2018

Asian record
AFC Futsal Club Championship: 5 appearances
2014: Group stage
2015: Quarter-finals
2017: Quarter-finals
2018: Third place
2019: Quarter-finals

References

Futsal clubs in Lebanon
Defunct futsal clubs
Sport in Beirut
Futsal clubs established in 2013
2013 establishments in Lebanon
2019 disestablishments in Lebanon
Organisations based in Beirut